is a Japanese manga series written by Kanehito Yamada and illustrated by Tsukasa Abe. It has been serialized in Shogakukan's shōnen manga magazine Weekly Shōnen Sunday since April 2020, with its chapters collected in ten tankōbon volumes as of March 2023. The series is licensed for English release in North America by Viz Media. An anime television series adaptation by Madhouse is set to premiere in Q4 2023.

As of March 2023, the manga had over 8 million copies in circulation. In 2021, Frieren: Beyond Journey's End won the 14th Manga Taishō and the New Creator Prize of the 25th annual Tezuka Osamu Cultural Prize.

Plot
The story follows elven mage Frieren, a former member of the party of adventurers who defeated the Demon King and restored harmony to the world after a ten-years-quest. In the past, the heroic group included Frieren, human hero Himmel, dwarven warrior Eisen and human priest Heiter. Before they part, they observe the Era Meteors together, a meteor shower that occurs once in fifty years. Frieren agrees to see them again and offer them a better view the next time the celestial event occurs. Frieren then departs and travels the world in pursuit of magical knowledge.

Frieren returns to the capital fifty years later; however, humanity has changed, and her former companions have distinctly aged. After one last adventure to see the meteor shower, Himmel dies of old age. During the funeral, Frieren expressed guilt for not attempting to learn more about him. Frieren then pays a visit to her other former comrades. She accepts an offer to teach and care for Fern, an orphaned child adopted by Heiter. She also receives an invitation to travel far north, to the resting place of souls, and see Himmel again to bid the hero a fitting farewell and express her feelings. To fulfill those requests, Frieren embarks on a journey together with Fern while still pursuing her passion for learning magic.

Frieren's elven nature grants her an extremely long lifespan, causing her to view periods of years or decades as ephemeral (this perception of time makes her consider the ten-year adventure with Himmel's party a fleeting experience). The story thus takes place across a long time, with periodic flashbacks accompanied by the physical and mental development of characters apart from Frieren herself.

Characters

An elven mage who was a group member that defeated the Demon King. Although she appears to be really young, she was born into a long-lived race of elves and has lived for over a thousand years. Because her sense of time is so dissimilar to that of humans, she has no qualms about working for months, if not years, at a time. After the death of Himmel, a member of her disbanded party, Frieren became regretful for not knowing him better during their ten-year adventure. As a result, she embarked on another journey to learn more about humanity. She has also traveled with a human wizard apprentice, Fern, since she took her on as an apprentice at Heiter's suggestion.
Over a thousand years ago, Frieren was saved by the great wizard Flamme and became her apprentice when her hometown, an elven settlement, was attacked by demons. After those traumatic experiences, Frieren developed a strong aversion to demons, and she naturally desired to eradicate them from the world. Following the Demon King's death, Frieren made substantial contributions to researching a demon-slaying magic while continuing to kill them whenever she could until the demon race was no longer as threatening as it once was. As the wizard who has buried the most demons in recorded history, she has earned the moniker "Frieren the Slayer", and is feared by the demon race. However, she is not without shortcomings and has also suffered several defeats. Since Frieren is an elf, she is generally insensitive to human emotions. She is occasionally clumsy in her interactions with others and is frequently falsely accused of being aloof. However, she is actually kind and caring.

Frieren's only apprentice. She is a war orphan from a southern country who had lost her parents and was about to commit suicide by jumping off a ravine in despair when Heiter came to her rescue. She began training in magic as a child under Heiter's tutelage in order to become more self-sufficient. She met Frieren, who came to visit Heiter, when she was nine years old. Fern requested that Frieren teach her magic so that she could become a full-fledged mage. After Heiter's death, she embarks on a journey as Frieren's apprentice at the age of 15. Later, she became a first-class mage after passing the examination while still in adolescence. As a privilege of being a first-class mage, Fern may ask Serie practically any magic in existence. Likewise, the newly appointed first-class wizard merely asked for a spell to remove the dirt off of any garments, much to Serie's dismay.

A human member of the original hero party, who died. He was the hero of the group and a self-proclaimed handsome man. After seeing a meteor shower together, he and Frieren promised to meet again. He died shortly after the two reunited fifty years later.

The other deceased human member of the hero party, the alcohol-loving priest of the group. He found, adopted, and raised Fern after the party dissolved.

Aside from Frieren, he is the other living member of the original hero party. He is a dwarf who also has a longer life expectancy than humans. However, since he was past his prime and growing old, even by dwarf standards, he refused Frieren's invitation to re-adventure.

Raised by Eisen, he is a young warrior who accompanies Frieren on her journey. He is a strong fighter despite his timidity.

A village monk who joins Frieren's party on her journey upon meeting him. He is a talented but mediocre monk who likes liquor, cigarettes, gambling, and older women. He abandoned Frieren's group to go find his best friend who had gone on alone adventure a long time ago.

A legendary wizard and the originator of humanity's magic. She is considered a mythological figure, and her existence is often questioned. Many of the grimoires attributed to her are believed to be fake, but in reality, she truly existed around a millennium before the story's beginning. She was the mentor of Frieren and the apprentice of the great wizard, Serie.
In the past, an elf village was invaded on the orders of the Demon King, and Flamme protected the lone survivor, Frieren. She could eliminate pursuers stronger than the Demon King's army's general in the blink of an eye. She taught Frieren an effective fighting method that included concealing her magical strength to catch opponents off guard and eliminate them with little effort, instructing her to spend the rest of her life doing so. Flamme's favorite spell was one that created a "beautiful flower garden." After Flamme died, Frieren, her apprentice, used this magic to decorate Flamme's grave to fulfill her mentor's last wish.

An elven woman who has lived since ancient times. She is an influential wizard and Flamme's instructor. About 1,000 years before the story begins, she met Frieren for the first time, whom Flamme had brought. Dubbed as a living grimoire, Serie is believed to possess nearly all of human history's magic and is considered by many to be the closest wizard to the Almighty Goddess.
Twenty years before Himmel's death, Serie established the Continental Magic Association, a powerful organization that governs magic usage and education throughout the continent. First-class mages have the honor of seeking her council and may request any spell they desire. Serie is also a mentor at heart, driven to nurture and guide young and promising wizards. Likewise, she could not connect with the laid-back attitude of Flamme and Frieren, despite their immense talent. Serie also refers to Frieren as "a wizard who is not skillful enough for her age."

Media

Manga
The series began in Shogakukan's shōnen manga magazine Weekly Shōnen Sunday on April 28, 2020. In January 2023, it was announced that manga would go on hiatus. In March 2023, the series resumed from its hiatus. Shogakukan has collected its chapters into individual tankōbon volumes. The first volume was published on August 18, 2020. As of March 16, 2023, ten volumes have been released.

In February 2021, Viz Media announced that they licensed the series for English release in North America, and the first volume was published on November 9, 2021.

Volume list

Anime
In September 2022, it was announced on the cover of the 9th volume of the manga that the series will receive an anime adaptation. It was later revealed to be a television series that is produced by Madhouse and directed by Keiichirō Saitō, with scripts supervised by Tomohiro Suzuki, character designs handled by Reiko Nagasawa, and music composed by Evan Call. The series set to premiere in Q4 2023.

Reception

Manga
By March 2021, the manga had over 2 million copies in circulation; over 5.6 million copies in circulation by February 2022; over 6 million copies in circulation by June 2022; over 7.2 million copies in circulation by September 2022; and over 8 million copies in circulation by March 2023. The manga ranked second on Takarajimasha's Kono Manga ga Sugoi! list of best manga of 2021 for male readers; and ranked sixth on the 2022 list. The series ranked second on the "Nationwide Bookstore Employees' Recommended Comics of 2021" by the Honya Club website. The series ranked 17th on the 2021 "Book of the Year" list by Da Vinci magazine; it ranked 10th on the 2022 list.

In 2023, it was ranked in the top ten graphic novels by the American Library Association's Graphic Novels and Comics Round Table's "Best Graphic Novels for Adults" list.

Critical reception
Rebecca Silverman of Anime News Network gave the first volume an A−. Silverman praised the concept of Frieren outliving her companions and being forced to live with an understanding of the human world and her own emotions, calling it an "interesting take on the fantasy genre". Silverman, however, commented that the art is not "quite up to the emotional tasks of the story". Richard Eisenbeis from the same website prised the second voulme of the series, saying that it "delivers both emotional tales and deep thematic explorations of human nature". He also described the fourth and fifth volumes of the manga as "an action climax that delivers not only a grand battle but also character-development and world-building. Smaller one-off tales that hit you right in your emotional core".

Wolfen Moondaughter of Sequential Tart gave the first volume a 9 out of 10. Moondaughter highlighted the slice of life nature of the story, despite its premise which involves a "D&D-style adventuring party", also praising the interaction between the characters and the art work, concluding: "If you want a break from fight scenes, and want something more serene and contemplative, this book should serve you well! It's also a lovely story of honouring the memory of lost loved ones, and dealing with grief." Sheena McNeil of the same website gave the first volume a 7. McNeil called the concept of "what happens to the party when the quest is over?" interesting, praising as well Frieren's struggling with "becoming less detached" and seeing her experiencing the "lovely poignant moments, bittersweet ones, and happy ones". McNeil also compared the series' pace and feel to Haibane Renmei. The Fandom Post named it the sixth best manga of 2021. They wrote: "Time waits for no man and that line may be overused but that line strikes a chord in this manga. There is always more to discover and Frieren has to learn that lesson as time marches on. It’s a sweet but harsh reminder to enjoy the moment for all its worth."

Awards and nominations

Notes

References

Further reading

External links
  
  
 

2023 anime television series debuts
Adventure anime and manga
Anime series based on manga
Drama anime and manga
Fantasy anime and manga
Madhouse (company)
Manga Taishō
Shogakukan manga
Shōnen manga
Toho Animation
Viz Media manga
Winner of Tezuka Osamu Cultural Prize (New Artist Prize)